The Home Builders Association of Northern California is a professional, non-profit association which promotes affordable housing and the construction of quality homes in California, USA. HBANC's membership comprises about 1,000 home builders, trade contractors, suppliers and industry professionals in the Bay Area.

HBANC connects individual members to the local construction industry by providing information, education and technical services, as well as networking opportunities through meetings and events. The association also has individual councils and committees that address issues from members’ perspectives.

HBANC had previously come under criticism from environmentalists due to its filing of a lawsuit against the United States Fish and Wildlife Service; claiming that the Endangered Species Act of 1973 was being used to hinder development and economic growth. On , the Ninth Circuit District Court ruled in favor of the Fish And Wildlife Service.

See also
 California Building Industry Association

References 
 Home Builders Association of Northern California
 California Building Industry Association
 Reference to HBANC lawsuit.
 Home Builders Association of Northern California et al. v. United States Fish and Wildlife Service et al.

External links
HBANC Web site

Organizations based in California